The Arena Marcel Bedard is a multi-purpose arena in Beauport, Quebec.  It has a capacity of 2,000 people.  It hosted the Beauport Harfangs ice hockey team.
Its surname is 'La petite cabane' (the little shack) in honour of Beauport's colourful coach, Jos Canale.

Indoor ice hockey venues in Quebec
Indoor arenas in Quebec
Sports venues in Quebec City
Quebec Major Junior Hockey League arenas